Fatim al-Amuq (also spelled Futtaim al-Arnouk) is a village in central Syria, administratively part of the Homs Governorate, east of Homs. It is adjacent to the village of al-Sayyid, west of Furqlus and south of Tell Shinan. According to the Central Bureau of Statistics, it had a population of 462 in the 2004 census.

References

Populated places in Homs District